Big Cottonwood Park is a public park in Millcreek, Salt Lake County, Utah. It is known as a regional park due to the vast play areas it has. In the park, it has a fenced-in round baseball diamond complex that can accommodate four games at once with restrooms and a concessions stand. A separate baseball diamond with bleachers located on the other side of the park. It comes complete also with full working playground for children. The playground was once made of concrete but was changed to plastic in favor of higher safety standards. There is a running trail as well as many picnic table with and without grills for BBQ. In addition, there is a large pavilion with tables an amphitheater, hopscotch area, horseshoe pits, and a close by men's and women's restroom.

External links 
 Big Cottonwood Regional at Salt Lake County Parks

Protected areas of Salt Lake County, Utah
Parks in Utah